Cookstown Airport  is located  northeast of Cookstown, Ontario, Canada. It is the headquarters of Skydive Toronto Inc.

References

External links
Page about this airport on COPA's Places to Fly airport directory
Skydive Toronto Inc.

Registered aerodromes in Ontario